CPSC may refer to:
 U.S. Consumer Product Safety Commission, a government agency
 Caloric Porous Structure Cell, a ceramic heat cell
 Colombo Plan Staff College, an inter-governmental organization in Asia Pacific for Technical and Vocational Education and Training
 Chuuk Political Status Commission